The Turks and Caicos Islands cricket team is the team that represents the British overseas territory of the Turks and Caicos Islands in international cricket.

In April 2018, the ICC decided to grant full Twenty20 International (T20I) status to all its members. Therefore, all Twenty20 matches played between the Turks and Caicos Islands and other ICC members after 1 January 2019 will be a full T20I.

History
Cricket is the national sport of the Turks and Caicos Islands. They became an affiliate member of the International Cricket Council (ICC) in 2002 and an associate member in 2017. Their international debut following their membership came in the Americas Affiliates Championship in 2004 when they played the Bahamas. They finished the tournament in fourth place, with their only win coming against Suriname. They played in Division Three of the ICC Americas Championship in 2006, finishing as runners up to Suriname, just missing out on promotion to Division Two. They were invited to take part in the 2008 Standford 20/20, playing one match in a preliminary round against Montserrat. The match, which held official Twenty20 status, resulted in a Montserrat victory by 9 wickets, resulting in their elimination from the tournament. Donovan Matthews top-scored for the team with 25, while no other batsman reached double figures. Henry Saunders took the only wicket to fall in Montserrat's innings. Shortly after, they took part in the 2008 ICC Americas Championship Division Three, which they won to gain promotion to Division Two. In 2010, they took part in the ICC Americas Championship Division Two, finishing fourth but retaining their status in Division Two. This was the team's last appearance to date in international cricket.

Records 
For a list of selected international matches played by Turks and Caicos Islands, see Cricket Archive.

Notable players
See :Category:Turks and Caicos Islands cricketers

References

External links
 Turks and Caicos Islands official website
 Turks and Caicos Islands member profile at the International Cricket Council
 Turks and Caicos Islands at CricketArchive

Cricket in the Turks and Caicos Islands
National cricket teams
Cricket
Turks and Caicos Islands in international cricket